James Oldaker (September 5, 1951 – July 16, 2020) was an American rock music, blues rock and country music drummer and percussionist.

Biography 
James Oldaker was born in Tulsa, Oklahoma. One of the first bands that he was a member of was called the Rogues Five, who saw regional success in the mid 1960s and opened for other more popular bands such as the Doors at the Tulsa Convention Center. Oldaker and the Rogues Five were a regular band on local Tulsa television station KOTV's teen dance show: Dance Party.

After a stint in Bob Seger's band (on the album Back in '72), he then was with Leon Russell's band when he was asked by Eric Clapton to participate in the recording of 461 Ocean Boulevard. Oldaker remained a member of Clapton's studio and touring bands through 1979, when the entire band was dismissed. Oldaker would return to the Clapton band in 1983, playing on Clapton's Behind the Sun album, released in 1985, and performing with Clapton at Live Aid that same year, before leaving in 1986. Oldaker appears on the blues side of the live recording 24 Nights from 1990 and 1991. Not long after leaving Clapton's band, Oldaker briefly became a member of Kiss guitarist Ace Frehley's project, Frehley's Comet, appearing on the 1988 album Second Sighting. He was also a onetime member of the alt country band, The Tractors.

Oldaker recorded with musicians such as the Bellamy Brothers, Asleep at the Wheel, Peter Frampton, Stephen Stills, Leon Russell, Ace Frehley, Freddie King, and the Bee Gees. In August 2005, Oldaker released Mad Dogs & Okies on Concord Records, a collection celebrating the music and musicians of Oklahoma, which he produced. Collaborators include Eric Clapton, Vince Gill, J. J. Cale, Willie Nelson, Ronnie Dunn, and Bonnie Bramlett. Mad Dogs & Okies/Survivors was re-released in 2019 under Jamokie Productions.

Personal life
Oldaker was involved in working with the organizers and the building of the OKPOP museum in Tulsa. He and his wife, Mary, were also hosts of an annual fundraiser, MOJO Fest, to raise money for the Tulsa Day Center for the Homeless.

Oldaker battled lung cancer in the 2010s, eventually becoming cancer-free by late-2019. However, the cancer had returned by the following year, and he died on July 16, 2020, in his hometown of Tulsa, Oklahoma, U.S. at age 68. In addition to his wife, he was survived by two children, Andrew and Olivia.

Discography

1973 - Bob Seger - Back in '72
1974 - Eric Clapton - 461 Ocean Boulevard
1974 - The Gap Band - Magicians Holiday
1974 - Leon Russell - Stop All That Jazz
1974 - Freddie King - Burglar
1975 - Eric Clapton - E.C. Was Here
1975 - Eric Clapton - There's One in Every Crowd
1976 - Eric Clapton - No Reason to Cry
1977 - Eric Clapton - Slowhand
1977 - Freddie King - 1934-1976
1978 - Eric Clapton - Backless
1979 - Peter Frampton - Where I Should Be
1980 - Peter Frampton - Rise Up
1980 - Asleep At The Wheel - Framed
1982 - Marcy Levy - Marcella
1985 - Eric Clapton - Behind the Sun
1988 - Frehley's Comet - Second Sighting
1991 - Eric Clapton - 24 Nights
1994 - The Tractors - The Tractors
1995 - The Tractors - Have Yourself a Tractors Christmas
1995 - Peter Frampton - Frampton Comes Alive II
1998 - The Tractors - Farmers in a Changing World
2005 - Jamie Oldaker - Mad Dogs and Okies

References

External links
 

American country rock singers
American country singer-songwriters
American country drummers
The Tractors members
1951 births
2020 deaths
Deaths from cancer in Oklahoma
Musicians from Tulsa, Oklahoma
Country musicians from Oklahoma
American rock drummers
American blues drummers
Singer-songwriters from Oklahoma
20th-century American drummers
American male drummers
20th-century American male musicians
Frehley's Comet members
American male singer-songwriters